Georgios Vovoras (alternate spellings: Giorgos, Yiorgos, Yorgos) (born January 18, 1977) is a Greek professional basketball coach, who last served as an assistant coach for Panathinaikos of the Greek Basket League and the EuroLeague.

Coaching career
Vovoras was the head coach of the Greek club OFI Irakleio, in the 3rd-tier level Greek B League, from 2008 to 2009. He was an assistant coach with the Greek club Peristeri, from 2010 to 2011. He then became an assistant coach with the Greek Basket League club Panathinaikos, from 2012 to 2014.

He then worked as an assistant coach with the Russian VTB United League club UNICS Kazan, during the 2014–15 season. He was next the head coach of the Cypriot League club APOEL Nicosia, during the 2015–16 season. With APOEL Nicosia, he won the 2016 Cypriot Cup.

He then returned to Panathinaikos, as an assistant coach, in May 2016. Vovoras became the interim head coach of Panathinaikos in October 2016, after the club's head coach, Argyris Pedoulakis, resigned from his position. Vovoras served as Panathinaikos' interim head coach, until the club signed Xavi Pascual to be the team's new permanent head coach. 

He was Panathinaikos' interim head coach again in 2018, after Pascual was replaced in that role by Rick Pitino. Vovoras worked as the club's interim head coach until Pitino was able to join the club.

On June 17, 2020, Vovoras was officially announced as Panathinaikos's new head coach for the upcoming season. On January 4, 2021, Vovoras and Panathinaikos amicably parted ways after a string of unfortunate results for the club, both domestically and in European competition. He was replaced by Israeli coach Oded Kattash.

Vovoras coached the Hungarian club Debreceni from November 2021 to February 2022, winning six of the eleven league games in which he led the team. On April 14, 2022, Vovoras returned to Panathinaikos and took over the head coaching position after the sacking of Dimitrios Priftis and several administrative members of the club, in order for the team to finish out the Greek Basket League season and playoffs. The following season he served as an assistant coach to Dejan Radonjić until the latter's firing on February 21, 2023.

References

External links
 EuroLeague Coaching Profile
 Panathinaikos B.C. Coaching Profile 

1977 births
Living people
APOEL B.C. coaches
Greek basketball coaches
OFI Crete B.C. coaches
Panathinaikos B.C. coaches
Sportspeople from Athens